Collective  is a box set, containing three CDs, by Clock DVA, released on August 3, 1994. It was first issued through Hyperium Records as a three-disc set. After the 1,000 pressings were sold, it was re-issued as a single disc through Cleopatra Records.

Critical reception
Dave Thompson, in Alternative Rock, wrote that it "chart[s] the band's progress from techno-soul to their early 1990s ice warriorhood."

Track listing

Release history

References

External links 
 

1994 compilation albums
Cleopatra Records albums
Clock DVA albums